Hryhoriy Varzhelenko (8 March 1950) is a retired Soviet professional footballer who currently coaches.

Varzhelenko started in 1960s being invited to play for a factory team of Trubnik Nikopol. He played for Nikopol professional clubs in 1960-1970s. He was forced to retire early at 24 due to knee injury.

In 1990s, Varzhelenko began to coach including his home teams FC Elektrometalurh-NZF Nikopol and FC Nikopol as well as FC Polissya Zhytomyr. 

As a coach, Varzhelenko became a first coach for such players like Dmytro Topchiyev, Pavlo Yakovenko, Mykola Kudrytskyi, and others.

References

External links
 

1950 births
Living people
People from Nikopol, Ukraine
Soviet footballers
Ukrainian footballers
FC Podillya Khmelnytskyi players
FC Dynamo Stavropol players
FC Elektrometalurh-NZF Nikopol players
Soviet football managers
Ukrainian football managers
FC Elektrometalurh Nikopol managers
FC Polissya Zhytomyr managers
FC Nikopol managers
Sportspeople from Dnipropetrovsk Oblast